Clark Murray (born 1938) is an American sculptor who is best known for his large outdoor constructions of welded and painted steel pipes.

Sculptures by Clark Murray include:
 White Mountains, a 1977 three-ton welded steel pipe sculpture was on loan for a brief time beginning in 1982 at the Laumeier Sculpture Park (St. Louis, Missouri.  Its current location is unknown.
 A 1973 untitled painted steel pipe sculpture at the University of St. Thomas (Houston, Texas) owned by the Menil Collection
 A 1974-5 untitled painted steel sculpture at the Museum of Fine Arts, Houston (Houston, Texas)
Daughter Kassondra Leigh Murray Golden

References
 Nierengarten-Smith, Beej, Laumeier Sculpture Park First Decade, 1976-1986, St. Louis, Mo., Laumeier Sculpture Park, 1986, 63.
 See, Ingram, St. Louis Sculpture Park, New York Times, March 22, 1987.
 Art Inventories Catalog, Smithsonian American Art Museum

20th-century American sculptors
Modern sculptors
1938 births
Living people
21st-century American sculptors